PP-296 Rajanpur-II is a Constituency of Provincial Assembly of Punjab.

Members of Assembly

2018-2023 PP-296 Rajanpur-IV

Elections 2018 
Tariq Dareshak of Pakistan Tehreek-e-Insaf won the seat by getting 42,190 votes. However, Dareshak died before he ever took oath.

Elections 2023

See also
 PP-295 Rajanpur-I
 PP-297 Rajanpur-III

References

External links
 Election commission Pakistan's official website
 Awazoday.com check result
 Official Website of Government of Punjab

Provincial constituencies of Punjab, Pakistan